Positive computing is a technological design perspective that embraces psychological well-being and ethical practice, aiming at building a digital environment to support happier and healthier users. Positive computing develops approaches that integrate insights from psychology, education, neuroscience, and HCI with technological development.
The purpose of positive computing is to bridge the technology and mental health worlds.
Indeed, there are computer and mental health workshops that are aimed to bring people from both communities together.

Everyone who uses technology is impacted by the way the tool is designed and even if most technologies may have small effects, they still apply to huge populations.

Background

Well-being in psychology
Technology researchers typically focus primarily on technical aspects, paying less attention to the ethical impact and ethical considerations of their products.
However, researchers from other fields such as psychology and philosophy studied these matters extensively and provided a wealth of methodologies to assess users' well-being, with thousands of quality-of-life assessment methods and validating studies.

Positive computing draws many ideas from positive psychology, a domain of psychology that focuses on societal well-being and improving quality of life.

Well-being in technology and technology research
The recognition of the impact of technology and inventions on people's lives has moved technology professionals to rethink the technology tools we use and seek a realignment of companies' goals to the social good. Exemplary of this disposition is the famous Google's motto, "don't be evil."

Technologies can be loosely classified into four groups according to their influence on the psychological aspects:
 Technologies that are not positive computing oriented: technologies in this category do not consider the psychological well-being of the user nor their influence on society and ethical values.
 Technologies that hinder well-being integration: they present compromises and obstacles to the well-being of the users; obstacles that, in a positive computing perspective, are seen as errors. These technologies should undergo a process of redesign. For example, social network platforms may need to be redesigned to reduce negative behaviors and prevent conflict.
 Technologies that provide active integration with positive computing principles: technologies in this group are designed to actively support components of well-being. Examples might be a word processor redesigned to support flow or a social media website designed to promote empathy.
 Technology dedicated to positive computing: purposeful, dedicated to well-being. Examples: promote empathy, increase mindfulness.

What is positive 
In Calvo's and Peter's seminal book on positive computing, they list the following as positive aspects to which we should aim when designing technologies: positive emotions, motivation, engagement, flow, self-awareness, self-compassion, mindfulness, empathy, compassion, and altruism.  
An encompassing term for general human welfare and happiness is eudaimonia which is extensively studied in positive psychology and which is inquired along different dimensions such as self-discovery, the sense of purpose and meaning in life, the involvement in activities, the investment in the pursuit of excellence, the self-perception of one's own potentials.

Autonomy, competence and relatedness 
There are three basic psychological needs according to  Self-determination theory (SDT): autonomy, competence, and relatedness, which can be briefly described as the feeling of psychological liberty and self-motivation, the feeling of having control and mastery, and the feeling of connection to others.

Solutions

Design to address the basic psychological needs 
The three previously mentioned basic psychological needs are measurable and well-defined characteristics that make them excellent as design targets.

To support autonomy, the design process needs to provide control over multiple options, provide meaningful rationales behind choices, enable the customization of the experience, and avoid controlling language.

Competence is also well-studied for game design, and the three main design factors supporting it are the appropriateness of the level of presented challenges, the presence of positive feedback, and the opportunities to learn and master the tasks at hand.

Relatedness-supportive environments need to be designed to provide meaningful and responsive interactions with others, respect human emotions, avoid disrupting social relationships, provide opportunities for social connections.

Responsible design process 

Responsible design, not to be confused with responsive design, comes from the integration of ethical analysis with well-beingsupportive design into engineering practice.
In particular, it features the double diamond design process model adding a post-launch evaluation phase.
The responsible design process consists then of five stages:
 Research: in this initial step, the designer team should investigate the needs of the users and the context in which they are immersed;
 Insights: this phase analyzes the data gathered in the previous one, synthesizing specific insights for the later stages;
 Ideation: this stage involves the generation of creative solutions that take into consideration the elicited technical and ethical requirements;
 Prototypes: in this last development stage, the team must eventually converge into practical solutions and build functioning prototypes to access the subsequent evaluation phase;
 Evaluation: this final phase comes after the rollout of the developed prototypes to evaluate their impact in the real-world scenario.

Superintelligence and intelligence explosion 
Intelligence explosion is a possible outcome of future computer science and computer engineering research, and I. J. Good described the first superintelligent machine as "the last invention that man need ever make," because of the vast influence it would have on our species.
Indeed, Nick Bostrom, in his book Superintelligence: Paths, Dangers, Strategies, proposes the common good principle according to which superintelligence should be developed only for the benefit of all and based on widely shared ethical ideals.

Malo Bourgon, COO of MIRI, stated that the AI community should consider best practices from the computer security community when testing their systems for safety and security before they are released for wide adoption.

Scientific venues
  Conference on Human Factors in Computing Systems (CHI)
 SIGCHI
 Journal of Medical Internet Research
 Journal of Cyberpsychology, Behavior, and Social Networking
 IEEE Transactions on Affective Computing

See also

 Cyberpsychology
 Social computing
 Technology and society
 Ethics of technology
 Appropriate technology
 Affective computing
 Science and technology studies
 Tristan Harris
 Center for Humane Technology
 Value sensitive design

References
Notes

Bibliography

Further reading

External links
 Doteveryone - the responsible technology think tank
 Ethics Kit | Methods & tools for ethics in the design process
 IEEE Ethics In Action in Autonomous and Intelligent Systems | IEEE SA - Resources
 Center for Humane Technology (CHT)
 List of projects from the Wellbeing Technology Lab

Human–computer interaction
Science and technology studies
Technology in society
Science in society
Cyberpsychology
Cybernetics